Grzegorz Arkadiusz Sudoł (born 28 August 1978 in Nowa Dęba) is a male race walker from Poland.

Competition record

Personal bests
3000 m walk – 11:42.7 (Germiston 2012)
5000 m walk – 19:06.07 (Reims 2012)
10,000 m walk – 40:58.89 (Kraków 2007)
10 km walk – 39:01 (Zaniemyśl 2005)
20 km walk – 1:20:50 (Lugano 2010)
30,000 m walk – 2:11:12.0 (Reims 2011)
50 km walk – 3:42:24 (Barcelona 2010)

External links

1978 births
Living people
People from Tarnobrzeg County
Polish male racewalkers
Athletes (track and field) at the 2004 Summer Olympics
Athletes (track and field) at the 2008 Summer Olympics
Athletes (track and field) at the 2012 Summer Olympics
Olympic athletes of Poland
European Athletics Championships medalists
Sportspeople from Podkarpackie Voivodeship